Aqa Mohammad-Ali Behbahani (1731-1801) was an Iranian Shia mojtahed, principally noted for his zealous hatred of Sufis.

Biography
Behbahani was born on 20 June 1731 in the shrine city of Karbala in the Baghdad vilayet of the Ottoman Empire (now Iraq) as the eldest son of the well-known mojtahed Mohammad-Baqer Behbahani, a native of Isfahan. He was brought up in Behbahan in southwest Iran.

References

1731 births
1801 deaths
People from Karbala
People from Behbahan
People of Qajar Iran
Iranian expatriates in the Ottoman Empire
Iranian Shia scholars of Islam